Margaret Hardinge Irwin CBE (13 January 1858 – 23 January 1940) was a suffragist, and Scottish labour activist who held important posts in the trade union movement.

Early life
Irwin was born off the coast of Peru onboard the ship Lord Hardinge, from which she took her middle name. Her father James Ritchie Irwin was the captain of the Lord Handinge. She grew up in Broughty Ferry in Forfarshire, and was educated privately and at the High School of Dundee, then studied at the University of St Andrews, from which she received a "Lady Literate in Arts" (LLA) degree, followed by attendance at the Glasgow School of Art and Queen Margaret College.  She then became involved in the women's rights movement, and also bought and ran a fruit farm in Blairgowrie.

Activism
In 1891, Irwin became the full-time Scottish organiser of the Women's Protective and Provident League, then in 1895 became the secretary of the Scottish Council for Women's Trades (SCWT).  In this role, she campaigned for the creation of the Scottish Trades Union Congress (STUC) and, when it was created in 1897, she was elected as its first secretary.  However, Robert Smillie became unhappy that she did not focus much attention on the campaign for an eight-hour day, and in 1900, Irwin decided not to stand for re-election.  However, she remained secretary of the SCWT, and frequently served as its delegate to the STUC over the next decade. One of her main interests was the conditions for women who worked at home. It had been found that the economic condition of these workers was about as desperate as it could well be. There were occasional instances of ability to earn a decent living, but on the whole wages were extremely small, and the hours of labour extremely long. The Glasgow Council for Women's Trades worked with John McAusland Denny to introduce a bill for the "compulsory provision of seats behind the counter for lady assistants in shops" that became the Seats for Shop Assistants Act 1899. The Glasgow Council for Women's Trades under her chairmanship, also delivered lectures on the ethics of shopping. The meeting, chaired by Watson Reid heard that "There was no such things as a bargain, because if a thing was produced at less than the current rate somebody had to pay for it. The remedy for this sweating and ill-payment was exclusive preferential dealing with shops where fair conditions prevailed and the religious boycotting of any shop where these were not to be found" 

Irwin was a founding member and secretary of the Glasgow and West of Scotland Association for Women's Suffrage. She was nominated by the association to attend the National Convention for the Civil Rights of Women, held in London on 16 and 17 October 1903. She resigned from this group in 1907, to join the more militant Women's Social and Political Union, and addressed the new Hillhead branch of the Women's Freedom League in 1908.

Later life
By the 1920s, Irwin was focusing much of her time on the fruit farm, developing model housing for workers there.  She was elected as a fellow of the Royal Society of Arts, and was made a Commander of the Order of the British Empire in 1927.  The SCWT dissolved in 1939, and Irwin died the following year.

Publications
 
 
 Irwin, Margaret Hardinge (1893) The conditions of women's work in laundries : report of an inquiry conducted for the Council of the Women's Protective and Provident League of Glasgow.
 Irwin, Margaret Hardinge (1896) Women's industries in Scotland : read before the Philosophical Society of Glasgow, 18 March 1896. From the Proceedings of the Royal Philosophical Society of Glasgow
 Irwin, Margaret Hardinge (1900) Home work amongst women : report of an inquiry conducted for the Glasgow Council for Women's Trades.
 Irwin, Margaret Hardinge & Smith, George Adam (1902) The problem of home work.

References

1858 births
1940 deaths
People from Broughty Ferry
People educated at the High School of Dundee
Alumni of the University of St Andrews
Alumni of the Glasgow School of Art
Commanders of the Order of the British Empire
General Secretaries of the Scottish Trades Union Congress
Scottish women trade unionists
Scottish suffragists
People associated with Glasgow
Women's Social and Political Union
19th-century Scottish women
20th-century Scottish women
Scottish suffragettes